Hurtle Victor Rice (7 July 1884 – 25 May 1960) was an Australian rules footballer who played with Essendon in the Victorian Football League (VFL).

Notes

External links 

1884 births
1960 deaths
Australian rules footballers from Melbourne
Essendon Football Club players
People from Box Hill, Victoria